Rogério Gonçalves Martins (born November 19, 1984) is a Brazilian footballer who currently plays for Iraklis as an attacking midfielder.

In 2005, Rogério moved abroad to play football in Greece, joining third-tier club Asteras Tripolis F.C. By age 31, he had completed eleven seasons in Greek football, scoring 51 goals in 292 appearances in all competitions. Rogério's first Super League Greece goal came in 2007, a match-winner against Panathinaikos while playing for Asteras.

After Rogério retired from playing in 2021, he joined the training staff of Agia Paraskevi F.C.'s youth academy.

References

External links
 

1984 births
Living people
Brazilian footballers
Brazilian expatriate footballers
Asteras Tripolis F.C. players
Ergotelis F.C. players
Olympiacos Volos F.C. players
Levadiakos F.C. players
Niki Volos F.C. players
Panthrakikos F.C. players
Aris Limassol FC players
Al-Orobah FC players
Egaleo F.C. players
Doxa Drama F.C. players
Super League Greece players
Expatriate footballers in Greece
Sportspeople from Minas Gerais
People from Uberaba
Saudi First Division League players
Expatriate footballers in Saudi Arabia
Brazilian expatriate sportspeople in Saudi Arabia
Association football midfielders